Grand Declaration of War is the second full-length studio album by the Norwegian black metal band Mayhem, released by Season of Mist and Necropolis Records on 6 June 2000. A re-release of the album came out in December 2018, with Jaime Gomez Arellano overseeing the production.

The album's title and some of the lyrics are taken from the writings of the German philosopher Friedrich Nietzsche, particularly his books Twilight of the Idols—Nietzsche called Twilight of the Idols "a grand declaration of war" („eine grosse Kriegserklärung“).

Musical style 
In his book Mean Deviation: Four Decades of Progressive Heavy Metal, Jeff Wagner wrote that Grand Declaration of War features "a variety of vocal shadings to match the multi-layered music", between "A Time to Die", described by Wagner as "one minute and forty-eight seconds of black calculus", "A Bloodsword and a Colder Sun" offering "squishy electronic groove, so close to trip-hop that it instantly became the album's most controversial track" and the "mesmerizing ten-minute sprawling landscape of doom" "Completion in Science of Agony". The album's "sonic clarity" was "a complete 180-degree turn" from the band's early "scuzzy 'necro' approach". Parts of the black metal scene had hoped Mayhem would not reform after the murder of the original guitarist Øystein "Euronymous" Aarseth as "that would not be right", or at least were "rather sceptical when it was known that [sic] MAYHEM should go on even without Dead or Euronymous". Many longtime Mayhem fans despised Blasphemer because "he wasn't Aarseth". Jeff Wagner calls Grand Declaration of War "Mayhem's own Into the Pandemonium, an album that had perverted and turned inside out the black metal genre as Celtic Frost's [Into the] Pandemonium had done to thrash metal". Alex Henderson of Allmusic stated that the band "has outdone itself with the epic Grand Declaration of War, which could arguably be described as black metal's equivalent of Queensryche's Operation: Mindcrime".

A remastered version of the album was released in December 2018; the original 'cold', 'sterile' production was swapped out for a more raw sound with the bass and drums made more prominent in the mix.

Critical reception 

Allmusic critic Alex Henderson wrote: "Grand Declaration of War won't appeal to anyone with a short attention span, but for those who can sit down and really give this CD their undivided attention, the rewards are great."

Track listing

Personnel

Mayhem 
 Maniac - vocals
 Blasphemer - guitar
 Necrobutcher - bass guitar
 Hellhammer - drums

Session musicians 
 Anders Odden - co-writing and programming of "A Bloodsword and a Colder Sun"
 Øyvind Hægeland - additional vocals on "Completion in Science of Agony"
 Tore Ylwizaker - samples and noise construction on "Completion in Science of Agony"
 Sebastian Ludvigsen - photography
 Mark Francombe Red - cover design
 Anne Cecilie Olavesen - makeup

References 

2000 albums
Mayhem (band) albums
Season of Mist albums